New Girl is an American television sitcom created by Elizabeth Meriwether. The show, set in Los Angeles, depicts the interpersonal adventures of offbeat teacher Jess (Zooey Deschanel) after her spontaneous move into an apartment loft with three men: Nick (Jake Johnson), Schmidt (Max Greenfield), and Winston (Lamorne Morris). Jess' best friend Cece (Hannah Simone) and their former roommate Coach (Damon Wayans Jr.) regularly visit them. The show also features a number of characters that appear as love interests, acquaintances, or family members for the characters in multiple episodes in a season or across multiple seasons.

Main characters

Jessica Day

Jessica Christopher "Jess" Day (Zooey Deschanel) is a bubbly, offbeat teacher in her early thirties who is originally from Portland, Oregon. After discovering in the pilot episode that her live-in boyfriend, Spencer, is cheating on her, she moves into the guys' apartment where Nick, Schmidt, and Winston (or Coach in the Pilot episode) help her move on from her break-up. The series follows her adventures as she goes through various relationships and jobs.

Nick Miller

Nicholas Sean "Nick" Miller (Jake Johnson) is one of Jess' roommates who works as a bartender. He and Winston are childhood friends from Chicago. At the start of the series, he struggles from having broken up with his long-term girlfriend Caroline. At a wedding event, he almost reunites with her. In the episode "Bells", it is revealed that he is fairly frugal and prefers to repair things in the apartment by himself rather than hire outside help. Out of everyone at the loft he is the worst with money, keeping all of his cash in a box and has never paid taxes, although ironically he is the most financially successful member of his family. It is implied by Schmidt that he dropped out of law school. Later on, in the episode "Clavado En Un Bar", it is revealed that he took and passed the California bar exam to prove he could do it, but decided he'd rather be a bartender instead. In the episode "Secrets", it is shown he is not good at keeping secrets, and sweats on his lower back. He is also not good with taking care of plants. After many failed relationships, Nick tries to rekindle his romance with Caroline and almost moves in with her at the end of season 1.

In season 2, he writes a zombie novel called Z Is for Zombie He and Jess become attracted to each other and they kiss in the season 2 episode "Cooler". Afterward, he and Jess are confused as to how to deal with their relationship, but later have sex in the episode "Virgins". They eventually agree to be a couple at the end of season 2, but break up towards the end of season 3. In season 4, he trains Cece to bartend. Along with hooking up with Tran's granddaughter Kai. He and Schmidt revive their business ventures, investing in a share of the bar where he works. In season 5, while Jess is sequestered on jury duty, he gets to know their temporary roommate Reagan Lucas, but only get as far as kissing before she leaves. They start dating at the end of season 5. At the beginning of season 6, he returns from New Orleans and works on his novel The Pepperwood Chronicles while maintaining a long-distance and later in-loft relationship with Reagan. However, at the end of season 6 he and Reagan break up, and he reunites with Jess. Three years later, in the season 7 premiere, Nick and Jess return to the loft after a European book tour for Pepperwood, although he is still waiting for the right time to propose to Jess. He eventually proposes to her in the episode "Mario", and they marry in the episode The Curse of the Pirate Bride". In the series finale, he and Jess move out of the loft to a two-bedroom apartment. A flash-forward reveals that he and Jess have a son in the future.

Schmidt

Winston Saint-Marie Schmidt, commonly known simply as Schmidt (Max Greenfield), is the guy who originally posted the online ad for a new roommate.  He is an overly confident ladies' man who is originally from Long Island, New York. While attending Syracuse University, he was very obese, and shared a dorm room with Nick and became life-long friends. Since then, he has worked hard to lose weight and to be seen as physically attractive and cool. Because of this, he often says offensive or cocky things, and every time he does, his roommates make him put money in the apartment's "douchebag jar". He is relatively wealthy compared to his roommates, having bought the couch and refrigerator, and splurging on things such as an $80 sushi plate; it was also noted that his family spent $40,000 on his Bar Mitzvah. Schmidt is a successful marketing associate, the sole male in a female-dominated office, and is known for his numerous flings with women. Schmidt's other quirks include a fear of feral cats, especially the one on their apartment's roof; being very controlling and a germophobe when it comes to preparing food; organizing things.

In the second half of season 1, he has a casual but passionate sexual relationship with fashion model and best friend of Jess, Cece. In the season finale, he ends his relationship with Cece because he feels she deserves someone better. In season 2, he continues to have feelings for Cece, being jealous of Cece's date Robby. He has a brief relationship with co-worker Emma who has him sign a sex contract. Towards the end of the season, when he realizes Cece is going to wed Shivrang, he rekindles a relationship with his college girlfriend Elizabeth and tries to sabotage the wedding. In season 3, he tries to date both Elizabeth and Cece but it does not last long. He moves into neighboring apartment 4C allowing for Coach to return as a roommate, but later moves back to 4D (sharing a room with Nick) after he uses his savings to fund a storefront for Jess's sister. In season 4, he dates councilwoman Fawn Moscato and tries to keep up with her climbing the social ladder, but eventually breaks up with her. In the season 4 finale "Clean Break", he realizes he cannot part ways with Cece and her stuff; he proposes to her. They marry at the end of season 5. In season 6, they purchase a fixer-upper house, and have it renovated. Towards the end of season 6, he is promoted to director of marketing, and in the final episode, he learns that Cece is expecting. In the season 7 premiere, it is revealed that Schmidt has become a stay-at-home dad to their three-year-old daughter Ruth. In the series finale, a flash-forward reveals that he and Cece have a son named Moses.

Schmidt's first name is a long-kept secret of the series, until the penultimate episode of season 6 "San Diego" in which it is revealed to be Winston and his middle name is Saint-Marie. He agreed with Winston Bishop to be called by his last name to avoid confusion.

Coach
Ernie Tagliaboo (Damon Wayans, Jr.) who goes by the nickname Coach, is a cocky and driven, yet sometimes awkward former athlete who works as a personal trainer. He is one of the roommates when Jess first moves into the loft in the pilot, but he moves out before the second episode for then-undisclosed reasons, allowing for Winston to take his place. In season 3, Coach had broken up with his girlfriend Malia and lives with the gang in the loft. He has worked as a personal trainer at gyms and as a sports coach and health class teacher at Jess' school. At the end of season 4, Coach moves to New York with his girlfriend May, He makes guest appearances afterwards in seasons 5–7, and is often mentioned. In the episode "Cece's Boys", it is revealed that he and May moved to North Carolina and have taken in a foreign exchange student named Montsie.

Cece 

Cecilia "Cece" Parikh (Hannah Simone) is Jess' best friend since childhood, a street-smart and snarky fashion model. Although she is fairly serious and cool, she does enjoy parties and has gotten drunk on occasion where she acts more wildly. Her parents were born in India. Initially skeptical of Jess's new roommates, Cece becomes interested in Schmidt after seeing him express his emotions while preparing Thanksgiving dinner. They have a passionate sexual relationship and try to keep it a secret from the others until they were discovered by Winston when he drove to Mexico. Despite Schmidt breaking up with her at the end of season 1, she retains feelings towards him.

In season 2, Cece dates a guy named Robby. She later discovers that she has limited time to conceive a baby and decides to enter an arranged marriage with a man called Shivrang. She calls off the wedding in the season 2 finale after realizing that she is still in love with Schmidt and has no feelings for Shivrang (who also turned out to be in love with someone else). At the start of season 3, a confused Schmidt misleads her as he attempts to carry on two distinct relationships. Cece soon discovers the truth and is left to recuperate after the break-up. She starts working part-time as a bartender at the place where Nick works, passes her GED exam and takes community college classes. While Schmidt is dating Fawn Moscato, Cece begins to have feelings for him again. She goes on a hiking trip to Mount Shasta, and when she returns she accepts his marriage proposal in the season 4 finale "Clean Break". They get married in the season 5 finale "Landing Gear", and buy a house, which they fix up in season 6. In addition to bartending, she opens up a modeling agency called Cece's Boys in season 6. In the final episode, "Five Stars for Beezus", Cece learns she is pregnant. Three years later, in season 7, she and Schmidt have a three-year-old daughter named Ruth, and her modeling agency was merged into a larger agency. In the series finale, a flash-forward reveals that she and Schmidt eventually have a son named Moses.

Winston Bishop

Winston L'Andre Bishop (Lamorne Morris) is Nick's childhood friend from Chicago. He first appears in "Kryptonite", where he moves into the apartment, replacing Coach who had vacated. Prior to his stay, he had been a point guard for a team in the Latvian Basketball League, but has been struggling to find meaningful work. He has the ability to master things quickly, as shown in the "Bells" episode, when he rings handbells, but is not so good with interacting with children when he is asked to lead them in a song. He enjoys pulling pranks on people but the jokes are either too small or too big. He also enjoys jigsaw puzzles and wearing shirts with pictures of birds or other animals on them.

After dabbling in some odd jobs, including being a nanny for Schmidt's boss Gina's son, he gets his break as a research assistant to a sports radio show host, which leads to his own show on the radio's late night shift. He dates Shelby, who he had treated neglectfully in the past. In the season 1 finale, it is revealed he his afraid of the dark, although after spending a night in the desert, he seems to get over it.

In season 2, he breaks up with Shelby in the Halloween episode. He later dates Daisy, but because of their schedule, they only have a small window of time to be with each other. Early in season 3, when he breaks up with Daisy, he takes ownership of her cat . He later dates a bus driver named Bertie. Having realized that others have been making his career choices for him all his life, he quits his radio host job, enrolls in a police academy, and becomes a police officer for the LAPD. He is partnered with the tough, but kind-hearted colleague, Aly Nelson. They start dating in season 5, and he proposes to her in season 6. Three years later, he and Aly are married and are expecting a child, living on their own. In the episode "Curse of the Pirate Bride", Aly gives birth to a baby boy whom Winston names Dan Bill Bishop, and in the series finale flash-forward scene, they have five children.

Reagan Lucas
Reagan Lucas (Megan Fox) is a gorgeous, no-nonsense bisexual pharmaceutical sales rep, first appearing in season 5 when she comes to town on business and shakes things up in the loft as the new "new girl" when she rents out Jess's room while the latter is sequestered on jury duty (during Zooey Deschanel's parental leave). She knows Cece (the first woman she slept with) from a previous gig they did together. Reagan starts dating Nick, but they eventually break up at the end of season six.

Ruth
Ruth Bader Parikh-Schmidt (Danielle Rockoff and Rhiannon Rockoff) is the daughter of Schmidt and Cece, first appearing in season 7 where she celebrates her third birthday.  Showrunner Brett Baer said that they chose to name her after U.S. Supreme Court Justice Ruth Bader Ginsburg because of Schmidt's character growth and change from someone who often objectified women to someone who admired strong women and wants his daughter to become President of the United States someday.

Secondary characters

Introduced in season 1
  (Mary Elizabeth Ellis), Nick's ex-girlfriend at the start of the series. She and Nick hook up briefly near the end of season 1, and Nick is about to move into an apartment with her.
  (Justin Long), a music teacher at Jess's school whom Jess takes a liking to. The guys remark that he is quirky and emotional like a male version of Jess. Jess thinks he makes a funny face when he cries. He later becomes engaged to Jenn, who Jess thinks is like an Asian version of her. In a season 4 episode "Walk of Shame", it was revealed that he and Jenn had broken up, and that he had been working as a clown entertainer for kids' birthday parties, but Jess convinces him to quit that and move forward with his life.

  (Michaela Watkins), Schmidt's boss and the Vice President at Associated Strategies. She is described as "tough, domineering, unpleasant". She has a baby shower in season 1 which Schmidt gets himself invited to.  She has a son named Elvin whom Winston befriends at the holiday Christmas party, and whom Winston watches over as a nanny prior to his radio show job.
  (June Diane Raphael), Jess's friend who is a lesbian gynecologist. She is pregnant in the second season. Her partner is Melissa, who is played by series writer Kay Cannon.
  (Gillian Vigman), Schmidt's other boss and the CFO at Associated Strategies. She has dark blonde hair. Some of her tasks seem like double entendres to Schmidt.
  (David Neher), Schmidt's former college roommate and "fremesis".
  (Rachael Harris), the vice principal at Jess's school in season 1. She joins Jess on the party bus.
  (Jeff Kober), the creepy landlord of the apartment building that the guys wanted to avoid using whenever possible. When Jess befriends him, he assumes she wants to flirt with him. He is also OK with having a threesome with Nick and Jess.
  (Lizzy Caplan), Nick's girlfriend in a story arc in season 1. At first she appears to be the perfect girl to Nick, but later it is revealed she has anger management issues. She is a lawyer who has a contrasting personality to the bubbly Jess.
  (Kali Hawk), Winston's love interest. They had a tryst before Winston went to Latvia, but after much apologizing on Winston's part, she agreed to give him a second chance. She manages a diner.
  (Dermot Mulroney), appears in the episodes "Fancyman" as the divorced father of one of Jess's students. He dislikes that his daughter did a weird art project and wanted to pull her out of Jess's class. Jess's boss reveals that Russell was the third largest donor in the city, and the episodes show that he has a fancy car and house, but that he is very generous and kind to Jess because he likes her. Mulroney described his role as being a person half-generation older, but that he had a blast working with the group. Mulroney's role was initially for three episodes but was extended to a fourth episode and also included guest star Jeanne Tripplehorn who played Russell's ex-wife. In the season 7 premiere, Russell says that he had remarried and divorced twice in the three years since Jess and Nick got back together, and has a toddler that is in the same gym class as Ruth. He hires Jess to work at his education-based non-profit.
  (Phil Hendrie), a sports radio personality who hires Winston as his research assistant. Hendrie himself is a radio personality.
  (Rebecca Reid), a Russian model and one of Cece's roommates. On Cece's prompting, she and Schmidt have a date, but it results in an awkward sexual encounter, in which Schmidt injures his penis and has to be hospitalized. Reid auditioned when the show was looking for fashion models that would serve as "intimidatingly taciturn roommates for Cece", and that the character was originally going to just say five words but her role got extended to three episodes. Reid said that she had met Russian models who acted like that. In the season 4 episode "Girl Fight", she has a baby shower.

Introduced in season 2
  (Nelson Franklin), Cece's new boyfriend in the season premiere. Laid-back and nice, he represents a contrast to Schmidt, who sees him as a rival, but later tries to ally with him against Shivrang. In season 6, he and Jess form a singles group dedicated to keeping their relationships platonic. He and Jess develop feelings for each other; however, during the episode "The Hike", they discover they are third cousins and break up. His last name is revealed to be McFerrin.
  (David Walton), Jess's love interest after she was laid off from teaching. Jess had planned to have just a physical relationship with someone who was just as disinterested as her at the time. Although Sam appears to be a spacey guy who likes Creed, he is actually a pediatrician.
  (Josh Gad), a beer delivery guy at the bar where Nick works. He initially takes an interest in Jess, causing Nick to nearly set them up on a date. They meet again in the season 4 episode "Walk of Shame".
  (Ralph Ahn), an elderly Asian man who Nick becomes friends with. He hardly speaks, but smiles a lot at Nick, and helps Nick defuse his anger with water therapy in the "Menzies" episode. The character was thought up by Johnson, and Meriweather and the writers thought he was funny and really easy to write for. He also helps Nick ask Jess out on a date. Tran's granddaughter also has a storyline in the show as Nick's love interest.
  (Carla Gugino) is the Vice President of the North American region of Associated Strategies. She and Schmidt have a brief sexual relationship that was prefaced with Schmidt signing a legal sex contract. Gugino described her character as like Fifty Shades of Grey but more comical.
  (Jamie Lee Curtis) is Jess's mother. She and Bob are divorced and she shares some personality quirks with Jess.
  (Rob Reiner) is Jess's father. Though he admits to having many similarities to Nick, he is very protective of Jess and disapproves of their relationship. In season 4, he proposes marriage to Ashley, one of Jess's former schoolmates, and marries her in the episode "Oregon", but is divorced again in season 6.
  (Rob Riggle), Schmidt's rival cousin, first showing at Thanksgiving. He returns in season 5 for the bachelor party festivities.
  (Olivia Munn), a bar patron that Nick falls for as she broke up with a boyfriend. She works as a stripper, but Jess encourages Nick to be with her. When asked about Angie and Nick's abrupt breakup, Munn said that it was more of a practical setting so that she could return to filming episodes for The Newsroom and that she liked seeing Nick and Jess together.
  (Dennis Farina), Nick's dad. He is a con man who during his visit in season 2, tries to get Jess to invest in buying a race horse and trying to sell it for studding. The gang later go to Chicago for his funeral, and he appears in a flashback episode afterwards.  Farina died several months after his appearances were broadcast on New Girl.
  (Satya Bhabha), Cece's fiance by arranged marriage. 
  (Brenda Song), Winston's love interest. She initially appeared at the bar wearing an engagement ring but that was to fend off guys. She tries to teach Winston to be more confident in picking up girls. Because of their schedules they only have a small window of time to interact. She is described as competitive and intense and disliking quitters. Although they part ways in season 3, Winston takes ownership of Daisy's cat Furguson.
  (Steve Agee), a homeless man who lives outside of the apartment building and often interacts with Jess and the roommates.
  (Merritt Wever), Schmidt's college girlfriend.
  (Curtis Armstrong), the eccentric principal of Coolidge Middle School. Despite his apparent incompetence and frequent oddness, he and Jess have a congenial relationship. His given name is Alan. Although he retires in season 5, he is still named Principal Foster for appearances in season 6 and 7.

Introduced in season 3
  (Angela Kinsey), a "snobbish "cool" teacher" at Coolidge Middle School. She is described as "turned off by Jess's diligence and goody-two-shoes approach to her job."
  (Brian Posehn), credited as Biology Teacher, works at Coolidge Middle School.
  (Jessica Chaffin) is a bus driver who becomes Winston's girlfriend when she found Winston's cat. Winston likes that she's down-to-earth.
  (Ben Falcone), the gay owner of the bar where Nick and Cece work.
  (Linda Cardellini), Jess's older sister, described as bit of a wild child. She is frequently in trouble with the law. The writers also used Cardellini as a character reference.

Introduced in season 4
  (Julian Morris) an attractive new science teacher from the United Kingdom who becomes Jess's love interest, although Jess struggles with entering the relationship because of her position as a vice-principal and the school policy of not having relationships with teachers. In the episode "Landline", the gang are confused as to how to pronounce his name, thinking it sounds more like "goes in you".
  (Greta Lee), Tran's granddaughter who becomes Nick's girlfriend. The gang worry that Kai is looking for a sugar daddy but Nick later discovers that she works as a consultant but is actually rich, with her own apartment. She enjoys staying on the couch with Nick, but eventually breaks up with Nick when he becomes too assertive in his career ambitions.
  (Zoe Lister-Jones), a city councilwoman who becomes Schmidt's love interest. She is described as controlling and manipulative, using Schmidt mostly as a model boyfriend to advance her causes. In the series finale, she has become mayor.
  (Nasim Pedrad), Winston's officer partner. She is petite, which gets the guys worried that she cannot defend herself, but she quickly proves them wrong. At first, she does not want to be friends with Winston, as another cop had fallen for her before and it did not work out. They become a couple in season 5 and get engaged in season 6. In the season 7 premiere, she and Winston are married and she is pregnant. In the episode "Curse of the Pirate Bride", she gives birth to a baby boy whom Winston names Dan Bill Bishop, and in the series finale flash-forward scene, she and Winston have five children.
  (Meaghan Rath), a girl that Coach keeps running into at the Valentine's Day bar crawl. She agrees to be Coach's girlfriend on the condition that he write her a nice e-mail, but when Coach accidentally sends off a number of rough drafts, she accepts him anyway. She plays the cello in a chamber ensemble, but is accepting of Coach's quirks and flaws as well as his interests, playing "Heavy Action" (the theme for Monday Night Football) for him. When she accepts a job in New York, she and Coach are about to break up but they both have second thoughts, and Coach agrees to move with her.
  (Nora Dunn), Schmidt's mother.  She is very strict and insists that Schmidt do all his bar mitzvah thank-you cards before granting him the money, and nitpicks his manners. She later proposes marriage to her long-time partner Susan toward the end of season 5.

Introduced in season 5
  (Fred Melamed), the CFO at Associated Strategies around the time when Schmidt is engaged.
  (Peter Gallagher), Schmidt's father. He is divorced, but made out with Jess in his introductory episode. He owns a vineyard. Nick and Schmidt do not trust him at first because he has been unreliable as a father to Schmidt, but he resolves to do better as a father after Nick tells him to clean up his act. In season 6, he gets in trouble when he dates six women at once.

Introduced in season 6
  (Ayden Mayeri), Aly's air-headed sister who initially works as a realtor.
  (Trent Garrett), a hunky attractive guy that Cece hires as a bartender. He later becomes Cece's first client for her modeling agency business.
  (Brian Huskey), Nick's publisher editor.

Notes and episodes cited

References

External links

 
 

New Girl
New Girl
Characters, list of